Chandrakant Patil may also refer to:

 Chandrakant Patil (born 1959), Indian politician, Higher and technical education minister of Government of Maharashtra and Kothrud Assembly constituency MLA
 C. R. Patil (Chandrakant Raghunath Patil; born 1955), Indian politician and Member of Parliament from Navsari loksabha constituency, Gujarat and present BJP president of the state
 Chandrakant Nimba Patil (born 1972/1973), Indian politician and MLA of Muktainagar Assembly constituency